A cylinder manifold is a group of large gas cylinders, commonly used to supply gases via a pipeline to a building such as a hospital. Cylinders are often arranged into two groups; a primary and secondary group. In a hospital, size J cylinders are commonly used, which are capable of holding 6800 litres of oxygen each or 13,600 of nitrous oxide. 

Initially, the gas is used up from the primary group first, with gas being expended equally from all cylinders, as they are connected in parallel through a common outlet. Once the levels in the cylinders are sufficiently low, a pressure transducer switches to the secondary manifold; allowing the primary manifold to be replenished. Manifolds are used to supply nitrous oxide, Entonox, air or oxygen; although a vacuum insulated evaporator is more commonly used to store oxygen.

Gas manifolds should be stored in an area separate from the main building. It should not be exposed to the environment and should be well ventilated.

Gas technologies
Industrial gases